Stanisław of Skarbimierz (1360–1431; Latinised as Stanislaus de Scarbimiria) was the first rector of the University of Krakow following its restoration in 1399. He was the author of Sermones sapientiales, comprising 113 sermons.

Stanisław was born in Skarbimierz, a town some 50 km north-east of Kraków. His sermons were the foundation of Polish political doctrine that culminated in the system of Nobles' Democracy ("Golden Liberty") in Poland and, from 1569, in the Polish–Lithuanian Commonwealth. Many ideas central to this doctrine may be found in subsequent works by Wawrzyniec Grzymała Goślicki (1530–1607) that appear to have influenced the 17th-century English Commonwealth as well as the Founding Fathers of the United States.

Along with Paweł Włodkowic, Stanisław framed the Polish position at the Council of Constance, pioneering ideas of modern human rights and international law. His sermons "About Just War" (De bellis justis) and "About robbery" (De rapina) laid foundations of the medieval theory of just war. The sermons justified the position of the Kingdom of Poland in its war against the Teutonic Knights. Stanisław died in 1431 in Kraków.

His Sermons were influenced by earlier works of Augustine of Hippo and Wincenty Kadłubek.

Footnotes

References
 (in Polish) L. Ehrlich: Polski wykład prawa wojny XV wieku. Kazanie Stanisława ze Skarbimierza De bellis iustis, ed. Wydawnictwo Prawnicze, Warszawa 1955;
 (in Polish) Olszewski Mikołaj, Świat zabobonów w średniowieczu. Studium kazania O zabobonach Stanisława ze Skarbimierza, ed. WYDAWNICTWO NAUKOWE Semper, Warszawa 2002, 
 (in Polish) R. M. Zawadzki: Stanisław ze Skarbimierza, [in:] Polski słownik biograficzny, vol. 42, Warszawa-Kraków 2003, p. 76-80 - http://www.ipsb.nina.gov.pl/a/biografia/stanislaw-ze-skarbimierza

Canons of Kraków
Academic staff of Jagiellonian University
Burials at Wawel Cathedral
1360 births
1431 deaths
Rectors of the Jagiellonian University
People from Kazimierza County
14th-century Polish Roman Catholic priests
15th-century Polish Roman Catholic priests